Kangan Rural District is a dehestan in the Central District of Jask County, Hormozgan Province, Iran. At the 2006 census, its population was 6,121, in 1,080 families. The rural district has 27 villages.

References 

Rural Districts of Hormozgan Province
Jask County